The Libya men's national under-18 basketball team is a national basketball team of Libya, governed by the Libyan Arab Basketball Federation.
It represents the country in international under-18 (under age 18) basketball competitions.

Its last appearance was at the 2014 FIBA Africa Under-18 Championship qualification stage.

See also
Libya men's national basketball team

References

External links
Libya v Guinea - Full Game - FIBA U18 African Championship 2018 Youtube.com video

Basketball teams in Libya
Men's national under-18 basketball teams
Basketball